The 1882 Columbian University football team was an American football team that represented Columbian University (now known as George Washington University) as an independent during the 1882 college football season. They played one game, a tie against Alexandria Episcopal High School.

Schedule

References

Columbian University
George Washington Colonials football seasons
College football winless seasons
College football undefeated seasons
Columbian University football